Joseph Gottfried Mikan (3 September 1743 – 7 August 1814) was an Austrian-Czech botanist born in Böhmisch-Leipa (Česká Lípa). He was the father of zoologist Johann Christian Mikan (1769-1844).

He was a student in Dresden, Prague and Vienna, and served as a spa physician in Teplice. In 1773 he became an associate professor, and two years later was appointed a full professor of botany and chemistry at the University of Prague. In 1798 he became rector of the university.

He was the author of Catalogus plantarum omnium (1776), which he dedicated to the botanical garden in Prague. The plant genus Mikania from the family Asteraceae is named after him.

References 
 Botany.CZ Homo Botanicus (translated biography)
 The genus Mikania (Compositae-Eupatorieae) in Mexico by Walter C. Holmes

Academic staff of Charles University
19th-century Austrian botanists
Czech botanists
1743 births
1843 deaths
18th-century Austrian botanists